A summit book or summit register is a record of visitors to the summit of a mountain. It is usually enclosed in a weatherproof, animalproof metal canister. Some books are maintained in an informal manner by an individual or small group, while others are maintained by a club. Well known and often climbed peaks, such as those on peak bagging lists, are more likely to have summit books.  On the other hand, mountains which are very heavily climbed or have popular trails up, such as Mount Whitney or Ben Nevis, may not have registers, or may have a daily log book that is changed out often.

The Sierra Club places official registers on many mountains throughout California and the United States. These are typically small notebooks kept inside large metal boxes.  When registers are filled up, they are collected and stored in the Bancroft Library in Berkeley, California where they are available to view.

Entries in a summit book vary, from a simple note of a person's name and date of the climb, to notes about the scenery or long essays about the events of the climb. Some summit books contain a record of climbs going back for many years. On an infrequently climbed peak, this record may exist in one volume on the peak itself, while on frequently climbed peaks with a well maintained register, this record may be spread over many volumes, all but the current one in the possession of the maintaining person or club.

Bibliography 
 Òscar Masó García: Libros de cima. A History of Passion and Conquest. Madrid 2018, Desnivel Editions,

References

External links 
Gallery of historical summit registers of the Association of Palatine Climbers

Mountaineering
Records management